Juan Martin Coggi (born 19 December 1961) is a former boxer from Argentina. A native of Santa Fe Province (he lived as a child until a few years Brandsen, Buenos Aires Province), which was also the birthplace of Carlos Monzón, Coggi was a three-time world light welterweight champion. He had 75 wins, 5 losses and 2 draws, with 44 wins by knockout. He never lost a fight by knockout.

Early boxing career
After a stellar amateur career, Coggi became a professional boxer on 2 April 1982, knocking out Horacio Valdes in four rounds at La Plata. Coggi won seven of his first ten bouts by knockout. The first boxer to last the scheduled distance with him was Viterman Sanchez, who lost a six-round decision to Coggi on 7 May 1982.

Coggi went undefeated for 21 bouts, with 11 knockout wins. Then, on 9 March 1985, he met Adolfo Arce Rossi in Buenos Aires. Arce Rossi became the first boxer to defeat Coggi by outpointing him over ten rounds. After one more win, Coggi fought to a draw over ten rounds with Ramon Collado, on 20 June of that same year.

Coggi went on a six-fight winning streak before he and Collado met again. Once again, Collado held him to a ten-round draw, on 19 July 1986.

On 25 October of that year, Coggi won the Argentine light welterweight title, knocking out Hugo Hernandez in three rounds.

Championship career
Despite having a record that included no one of apparent relevance, the WBA placed Coggi on top of their list of challengers for the world crown at the light welterweight division. After one more win, Coggi challenged for the world title for the first time.

The WBA's world champion, Patrizio Oliva, had dethroned Coggi's countryman, Ubaldo Sacco, to win the world championship. So the fight between Coggi and Oliva generated much interest among Argentine boxing fans. Coggi's first title try was also his first fight abroad, as the fight was held in Ribera, Italy, on 4 July 1987. Coggi caused a minor upset when he knocked out Oliva in three rounds to become world champion.

Like Monzon, Coggi also became well liked in Italy despite the fact he had beaten an Italian for the world championship. Coggi would fight in Italy a number of times during the rest of his career. His first title defense came in Italy, when he knocked out Sang-Ho Lee in two rounds on 7 May 1988.

After beating Lee, he would win four non-title bouts in his country, including two ten-round decisions over Jorge Tejada, who later became a contender in the welterweight division.

For his second defense, Coggi returned to Italy, where he defeated perennial contender Harold Brazier of the United States by a twelve-round unanimous decision on 21 January 1989.

His third defense, on 29 April 1989, was also held in Italy. He defeated future world champion Akinobu Hiranaka by a twelve-round decision. However, this match was controversial for the decision which gave Italian-Argentine boxer Coggi excessive favor, while Coggi was knocked down by Hiranaka twice at 3rd round, and he has been inferior to Hiranaka at performance throughout 12 rounds. Among many boxing fans, there have been the strong voice that the victory should have been given to Hiranaka, since the match was owned by him. 
After two non title wins, Coggi had four fights in France, beginning with a fourth-round knockout victory over Jesse Williams in another non-title bout.

On 24 March 1990, Coggi beat the former lightweight champion José Luis Ramírez by a twelve-round unanimous decision to retain the title. After beating Danilo Cabrera by knockout in round five, Coggi defended his title in Nice against the relatively unheralded Loreto Garza of Sacramento, California, on 17 August. This time around, it was Coggi's turn to lose in a mild upset, as Garza became the champion by outpointing Coggi over twelve rounds.

On his next fight, held on 11 November at Buenos Aires, Coggi once again outpointed Tejada over ten rounds.

His next fight happened under extremely unlikely circumstances: he was in Sacramento to watch Garza defend his world title and, at the same time, challenge him to a rematch, when one of the boxers to be featured as part of the night's undercard suffered a car accident at the ARCO Arena parking lot and broke his wrist. Coggi took on the role of substitute fighter, and he beat Alberto Alcaraz by a knockout in round seven, 1 December.

Coggi went on to win his next eleven fights, six of them by knockout, before challenging Morris East for the WBA title on 12 January 1993, in Mar del Plata. Coggi became a light welterweight champion for the second time that night when he knocked East out in eight rounds.

On 10 April 1993, he made his first defense of his second reign, knocking out perennial Puerto Rican world title challenger Joe Rivera in seven rounds, in Mar del Plata. Next, he defended against Hiroyuki Yoshino on 23 June. In what marked his Asian debut, Coggi knocked Yoshino out in five rounds, in a fight held in Tokyo, Japan.

He defended his title three more times in 1993. On 13 August, he outpointed Jose Rafael Barbosa over twelve rounds in Buenos Aires, once again, retaining the world title. On 24 September, he knocked out Guillermo Cruz in ten rounds at Tucumán, and then, on 11 December, he closed 1993 by knocking out Eder Gonzalez, also in Tucumán, in the seventh round.

He and Gonzalez had a rematch on 18 March 1994. In what marked Coggi's American debut, he knocked Gonzalez out in three rounds at Las Vegas, Nevada, once again, retaining the title.

Bouts with Frankie Randall
On 17 September 1994, he began a series of three bouts with former Chávez-conqueror Frankie Randall, who relieved Coggi of the title by beating him by a twelve-round unanimous decision. Coggi suffered three knockdowns during the fight.

Coggi had two more wins, then he faced Randall for the second time. Coggi became champion for the third time on 13 January 1996, when he beat Randall by a fifth round technical decision. Randall was controlling the fight when he went down when his feet became tangled with Coggi in the third round. Because Coggi landed a glancing blow as Randall went down, Coggi was credited with a knockdown by the referee. In the fifth round, the two fighters clashed heads and Coggi walked to his corner and lay down. The referee tried to convince Coggi to fight but he was either unwilling or unable to do so. The ringside physician later said that Coggi was coherent and when Coggi was examined at a hospital after the fight, he was given a clean bill of health. The fight went to the scorecards and Coggi was ahead on all judges' cards by one point (due to the knockdown called against Randall in the third round).
 
The third fight between Coggi and Randall came on 16 August, at Buenos Aires. Coggi suffered a knockdown in the second round, which would prove to be pivotal in the end, as Randall pulled a unanimous but close decision to recover the title.

Post-championship career
The rest of his career, Coggi fought second level opposition, posting five wins in a row, three by knockout, before facing another well known fighter. In Coggi's last fight, contended on 29 May 1999, he lost a twelve-round unanimous decision to Michele Piccirillo in Italy.

Retirement
Coggi is now a boxing trainer. His son, Martin Antonio Coggi, is a professional boxer.

Coggi was one of Raúl Alfonsín's favorite boxers: in a rare opportunity for a boxer, President Alfonsín invited Coggi to his presidential home after Coggi became world champion for the first time.

Professional boxing record

See also
List of world light-welterweight boxing champions

References

External links

 

1961 births
Living people
Argentine male boxers
Sportspeople from Santa Fe, Argentina
World Boxing Association champions
World light-welterweight boxing champions
Southpaw boxers
Boxing trainers